Djuice Dragons is a Norwegian Volvo Ocean 60 yacht. She competed in the 2001–02 Volvo Ocean Race and finished sixth, skippered by Knut Frostad.

Djuice Dragons was designed by Laurie Davidson.

References

Ships of Norway
Volvo Ocean 60 yachts
Volvo Ocean Race yachts
Sailing yachts of Norway
Sailing yachts built in New Zealand
Sydney to Hobart Yacht Race yachts
2000s sailing yachts